Juliopol may refer to the following places in Poland:
Juliopol, Lublin Voivodeship (east Poland)
Juliopol, Masovian Voivodeship (east-central Poland)